Glory By Honor XIV was a two night, two city professional wrestling event produced by the U.S.-based wrestling promotion Ring of Honor, and the 14th Glory By Honor. The first night of the event took place on October 23, 2015 at the Wing's Event Center in Kalamazoo, Michigan.  The second part of the event took place on October 24, 2015 at Montgomery County Fairgrounds Coliseum in Dayton, Ohio.

Storylines 
Glory By Honor XIV featured professional wrestling matches involving wrestlers engaged in scripted feuds or storylines that play out on ROH's television program, Ring of Honor Wrestling. Wrestlers portrayed heroes (faces) or villains (heels) as they followed a series of events that built tension and culminated in a wrestling match or series of matches.

At Best in the World on June 19, 2015, Jay Lethal defeated Jay Briscoe to win the ROH World Championship and retain the ROH World Television Championship, and on September 18 at All Star Extravaganza VII The Kingdom defeated The Addiction to win the ROH World Tag Team Championship. On September 29, 2015, ROH announced that Glory By Honor XIV would feature a Champions vs. All Stars theme.

On September 18 at All Star Extravaganza VII The All Night Express returned to defeat The Briscoes in an Open Challenge Tag Match. On October 6, ROH announced that Kenny King and Rhett Titus would go head to head with Jay Briscoe and Mark Briscoe in an All Star Extravaganza VII rematch at Glory By Honor XIV.

On September 18 at All Star Extravaganza VII, The Kingdom (Michael Bennett and Matt Taven) defeated The Young Bucks and former ROH World Tag Team Champions The Addiction in a 3-way tag team match after a masked KRD member attacked Christopher Daniels. On October 7, ROH announced that The Addiction would cash in their rematch clause to face The Kingdom at Glory By Honor XIV.

Results

Night 1 - Kalamazoo, MI

Night 2 - Dayton, OH

References

2015 in professional wrestling
2015 in Ohio
Events in Dayton, Ohio
2015 in Michigan
Events in Michigan
Professional wrestling in Michigan
14
Professional wrestling in Dayton, Ohio
October 2015 events in the United States